The Complexe sportif Claude-Robillard, abbreviated CSCR, is a multi-purpose sport facility, located in Montreal, Quebec, Canada, in the borough of Ahuntsic-Cartierville.

History
The Complexe sportif Claude-Robillard was built for the 1976 Summer Olympics. It played host to the handball and water polo competitions as well as being the training centre for athletics, swimming and field hockey during the games.

Overview
The facility is made up of two buildings: the Michel-Normandin arena and the main building itself. At the heart of the facility lie a ten-lane Olympic-size swimming pool and smaller pool with diving towers, home to the award-winning CAMO swim club, as well as an indoor track, an omni-sport training room and a number of gymnasiums. On the grounds lie a number of other installations: a running track, a regulation-sized soccer pitch, a second pitch with an artificial surface, originally designed for field hockey, but resurfaced in 2006 and configured for soccer and Canadian football, tennis courts, baseball diamonds, and so forth. The running track and the large soccer pitch sit in the middle of a 6,500-seat stadium.

The facility plays host to many national and international sporting competitions. Yearly events include the Jeux de Montreal and the Défi sportif (for handicapped athletes). The facility is also the headquarters for a number of clubs, some of which participate at an elite level, while others, such as Sports Montréal and APADOR, provide services to the general public.

Montreal's soccer team, the Montreal Impact, played its home games on the large soccer pitch from 1993 to 2007 and both the professional team and its academy trained there until 2015. Montreal Impact's USL-Pro affiliate FC Montreal played their games at Claude Robillard in 2016.

Origin of the name
The Complexe sportif Claude-Robillard was named for Claude Robillard, who was the first director of the City of Montreal's urban planning department.

High-performance training
The Complexe sportif Claude-Robillard is a centre for high-performance training for a number of sports, including:

References

1976 Summer Olympics official report. Volume 2. pp. 118–23.
City of Montreal 
Sports Montréal 
Défi sportif 

Venues of the 1976 Summer Olympics
Athletics (track and field) venues in Quebec
Olympic handball venues
Olympic water polo venues
Sports venues in Montreal
Soccer venues in Montreal
CF Montréal
Ahuntsic-Cartierville
1970s establishments in Quebec